Super I/O is a class of I/O controller integrated circuits that began to be used on personal computer motherboards in the late 1980s, originally as add-in cards, later embedded on the motherboards. A super I/O chip combines interfaces for a variety of low-bandwidth devices. Now it is mostly merged with EC.

The functions below are usually provided by the super I/O if they are on the motherboard:

 A floppy-disk controller
 An IEEE 1284-compatible parallel port (commonly used for printers)
 One or more 16C550-compatible serial port UARTs
 Keyboard controller for PS/2 keyboard and/or mouse

Most Super I/O chips include some additional low-speed devices, such as:
 Temperature, voltage, and fan speed interface
 Thermal Zone
 Chassis intrusion detection
 Mainboard power management
 LED management
 PWM fan speed control
 An IrDA Port controller
 A game port (not provided by recent super I/O chips anymore because Windows XP is the last Windows OS to support a game port unless the vendor has a custom driver in the future OS)
 A watchdog timer
 A consumer IR receiver
 A MIDI port
 Some GPIO pins
 Legacy Plug and Play or ACPI support for the included devices

By combining many functions in a single chip, the number of parts needed on a motherboard is reduced, thus reducing the cost of production.

The original super I/O chips communicated with the central processing unit via the ISA bus. With the evolution away from ISA towards use of the PCI bus, the Super I/O chip was often the biggest remaining reason for continuing inclusion of ISA on the motherboard.

Later super I/O chips use the LPC bus instead of ISA for communication with the central processing unit. This normally occurs through an LPC interface on the southbridge chip of the motherboard.

Since Intel is replacing the LPC bus with the eSPI bus, super I/O chips that connect to that bus have appeared on the market.

Companies that make super I/O controllers include Nuvoton (has incorporated Winbond), Fintek Inc. ,ENE Tech. (for laptop) and Microchip Technology (has incorporated SMSC™). National Semiconductor (Now Texas Instruments) used to make super I/O controllers but sold that business to Winbond at 2005, which already had a competing super I/O controller business. In 2008, Winbond then spun off its logic businesses to a wholly owned subsidiary, Nuvoton. SMSC made super I/O chips and then got acquired by Microchip Technology.

Common Models and Brief

ENE Tech.
Many models are used for laptops with built-in keyboard controllers
KB3930
KB930QF

ITE Inc.

Nuvoton Technology

See also 
 envsys
 hw.sensors
 lm_sensors contains a tool named sensors-detect that can also detect which Super I/O is used on a mainboard
 SpeedFan
 Embedded Controller (EC)

References

External links 
 Superiotool is a Linux user-space tool to detect which Super I/O is used on a mainboard, and it can provide detailed information about its register contents. 

Motherboard
Input/output integrated circuits